Francis Laurent (born 6 January 1986) is a French footballer who last played for FC Chambly.

Career
Laurent started his career in his native France signing for FC Sochaux where he made twelve appearances in his first season. He took the decision to pursue his career in Germany, moving to SV Eintracht, scoring four goals in 14 games. He then went on to sign for 1. FSV Mainz 05 where his development as a player continued.

Laurent signed a one-year contract with Southend United on 28 August 2008, following an impressive trial. On 18 October 2008, he came off the bench for his first league appearance and scored the match winner in the 71st minute heading in Peter Clarke's cross. His contract was extended in December to a -year deal. Laurent left Southend at the end of the 2009–10 season.

Laurent appeared as a trialist for Coventry City in a pre-season friendly against West Bromwich Albion on 31 July 2010, making an appearance in the 57th minute. Laurent also had a pre season trials with Sheffield United and Cardiff City, during which he scored a hat-trick in a reserve team fixture against Llanelli.

Laurent returned to France and signed a short-term contract with AFC Compiègne on 1 October 2010. On 14 January 2011, he joined Northampton Town on a free transfer until the end of the season, with an option to increase the deal until the end of next season.

At the start of the 2011–12 season, Laurent joined Conference National club Lincoln City in July 2011. On 8 June 2012, he seemed set for Doxa but instead joined K.V.K. Tienen linking up with his former teammates Jean-Francois Christophe and Jean Arnaud.

References

External links

Lincoln City F.C. Official Archive Profile

1986 births
Living people
Footballers from Paris
French footballers
Association football forwards
FC Sochaux-Montbéliard players
1. FSV Mainz 05 players
Southend United F.C. players
Northampton Town F.C. players
Lincoln City F.C. players
Doxa Katokopias FC players
English Football League players
2. Bundesliga players
FC Chambly Oise players